Kydonia or Cydonia was an  ancient city-state on the northwest coast of the island of Crete. It is at the site of the modern-day Greek city of Chania.  In legend Cydonia was founded by King Cydon, a son of Hermes or Apollo and of Akakallis, the daughter of King Minos. According to Pausanias he was son of king Tegeates.

Diodorus Siculus mentions that the city was founded by King Minos. The editors of the Barrington Atlas of the Greek and Roman World suggest that the city also bore the name Apollonia.

Prehistoric period 

The name of the city is first mentioned in Linear B tablets from Knossos (ku-do-ni-ja). At Kastelli hill, which is the citadel of Chania's harbor, archaeological excavations have discovered ceramic sherds, which date back to Neolithic era. Scarce finds such as walls and ground floors confirm that the systematic habitation of the hill began during Early Minoan (EM) II period. A Minoan House (House I) with the characteristic hall was also unearthed. It was destroyed by fire during Late Minoan (LM) IB period. The houses from LMIIIA phase belonged to a palatial settlement, which ceased to exist in LMIII.

The city extended beyond Kastelli hill as the excavations in Daskalogiannis Street revealed, where a LMI sanctuary or “lustral basin’’ came to light.
The discovery of a corpus of Linear A and Linear B tablets points out the presence of an archive. Moreover, the archaeologists have identified the existence of a local pottery workshop, which was active in LMIII.

Geometric and Archaic periods 
It is peculiar that Homer in the Odyssey mentions Kydones (tribe) not Kydonians. They dwell on the two sides of Iardanos river. Herodotus considers that the city was founded by Samians in ca. 520 BC, who later on were defeated and enslaved by a coalition of Aeginetans and Cretans. Aegina also sent colonists to the Cretan city. Due to this relationship, the city at an early phase minted coins which resemble those of the aforementioned island. Archaeological evidence from these periods is limited.

Classical and Hellenistic periods 
In 429 BC, during the Peloponnesian War, Kydonia was attacked by the Athenians after the accusations of Nikias from Gortyna for pro-Spartan policy.
In 343 BC the city was besieged by Phalaikos and his army of mercenaries after his failed attempt to capture Lyttus. He was killed from a lightning strike that burnt his siege engines.

In the Hellenistic period times Kydonia took part in the struggle for domination among the cities of Crete. At the end of the 3rd century BC a peace treaty with Aptera was signed.

During the Lyttian War In 220/219 BC both cities joined the alliance of Oreioi (in which Polyrrhenia was a member) and canceled the one with Knossos. Aggressive policy led to the capture of Phalasarna (184 B.C.E) and 14 years later that of Apollonia, an action criticized by Polybius since they were allies.

In 69 BC the Romans under Quintus Caecilius Metellus Creticus, after the failed attempt of Marcus Antonius Creticus, invaded Crete. The Cretan general Lasthenes confronted them in the battle of Kydonia, where he lost and retreated. This outcome forced Cretan general Panares to capitulate to the Romans and deliver them the city without resistance.
The coins of the city-state depict Kydon either as an infant suckling a female Cretan hound or as an archer stringing his bow, accompanied by his dog.

The remaining base from the Hellenistic wall can be seen below the Byzantine wall of Kastelli hill. Rescue excavations have discovered Hellenistic facilities below buildings of the modern city.

Roman, Late Roman and Byzantine periods 
After the battle of Actium (31 BC) Augustus set Kydonia free for its assistance to him. Cydonians are mentioned in book 12 of the Aeneid, where their excellent bow skills are used in an extended Virgilian simile describing the Fury's descent to Juturna.
In 365 the city must have been affected by the earthquake that devastated many cities of Crete.
The Episcopate of Kydonia is referred in many ecclesiastical documents. The earlier is in 381 when Kydonius the bishop of Kydonia takes part in the First council of Constantinople. The prosperity of the city during Late Roman times is illustrated by the mosaics of houses found near Agora Square. Roman workshops have been found in some parts of the modern city. Material from the urban architecture of the ancient city was used for the construction of Kastelli hill's Byzantine wall.

The first Byzantine period of Kydonia ended with the Arab conquest of Crete in the 820s. After the Byzantine reconquest of Crete in 961, the bishopric was transferred outside the city near the village of Agya.

Change of name and preservation 
It is uncertain when the toponym Kydonia ceased to be used. The scholars suggest that the name was changed by the Arabs, who named the city al-Hanim (hostel), which could also derive from a suburb of Kydonia called Alchania komi, where the god Velchanos was worshiped. Another theory projects the toponym Lachanias as a derivative of the modern name. At the beginning of the Venetian rule (1212) Kydonia is mentioned as Canea.

The name is preserved in the Metropolis of Kydonia and Apokoronas, which was established in 1962.
Today's archaeological recoveries from the ancient city of Kydonia are largely stored in the Chania Archaeological Museum in present-day Chania.

Location 
Ancient authors indicate the position of Kydonia in the western part of Crete, facing the Peloponnese. Strabo had calculated its distance from other cities of Crete.

The exact location of Kydonia was not understood until Robert Pashley worked it out based solely on ancient historical literature, without any archaeological recovery; John Pendlebury also identified Chania with ancient Kydonia.

Necropolis 
Since Kydonia was inhabited for centuries, the necropolis of the city is quite extended and includes graveyards from all periods. It lies below the modern city of Chania. Burial types that have been found are: chamber tombs, cist graves and loculus tombs.

People 
 Aristocles (5th century BC), sculptor
 Kresilas (5th century BC), sculptor

See also
List of ancient Greek cities
Malaxa
Polichne
Cydonia (region of Mars)

References

Sources
 C. Michael Hogan, Cydonia, Modern Antiquarian, January 23, 2008 
 Robert Pashley, Travels in Crete, 1837, J. Murray
 Ian Swindale, Kydonia, 
 Marie-Louise Winbladh, The Greek-Swedish Excavations at Chaniá), Stockholm 2000.
 Marie-Louise Winbladh, Adventures of an archaeologist. Memoirs of a museum curator, AKAKIA Publications, London 2020

Chania (regional unit)
Cretan city-states
Former populated places in Greece
History of Crete